Spyridon Nikolaou Marinatos (November 4, 1901 – October 1, 1974) was a Greek archaeologist, best known for leading excavations at Akrotiri on Santorini (1967–74), where he died and is buried.  He specialized in the Bronze Age Minoan and Mycenaean civilizations.

His daughter Nanno Marinatos (born 1950) is also a scholar of Minoan culture, and Head of the Classics and Mediterranean Studies Department at University of Illinois at Chicago.

Career 
Marinatos began his career in Crete as director of the Heraklion Museum along with Georgia Andrea in 1929 where he met Sir Arthur Evans. He conducted several excavations on Crete at Dreros, Arkalochori, Vathypetro and Gazi, all of which resulted in spectacular finds. In 1937, he became director of the Antiquities Service in Greece for the first time. Shortly afterwards, he became a professor at the University of Athens. He turned his attention to the Mycenaeans next, regarding them as the first Greeks. He excavated many Mycenaean sites in the Peloponnese, including an unplundered royal tomb at Routsi, near Pylos. He also dug at Thermopylae and Marathon uncovering the sites where the famous battles had occurred.

His most notable discovery was the site of Akrotiri, a Minoan port city on the island of Thera. The city was destroyed by a massive eruption which buried it under ashes and pumice. The tsunamis created by the eruption destroyed coastal settlements on Crete as well.  Guided by the local Nikos Pelekis, Marinatos began excavations in 1967 and died on site in 1974, after suffering a fatal accident. According to one version, he died during the excavation as he was hit by a collapsing wall.

Marinatos was an elected member of the American Philosophical Society as of 1966.

Politics 
He was director-general of antiquities for the Greek Ministry of Culture during the Greek military junta of 1967–74 (Regime of the Colonels). The acquaintance he cultivated with the colonels who were in power in Greece, especially the leader of the military junta, Georgios Papadopoulos, was ideologically based. Professor Marinatos was a nationalist in many regards whose ideals, some of his political opponents allege, influenced his archaeological work. Although no evidence of "ideological influence" regarding his actual work has ever been proven, his political affiliation created controversy among his academic peers nonetheless, since most of his peers who criticized the military junta, were fired or persecuted by the government of Papadopoulos. Eventually, Marinatos was fired too, by the dictator Ioannides, who made sure to get rid of all the close associates of Papadopoulos when he seized power in 1973.

Books 
His Crete and Mycenae was originally published in German in 1960.<ref>Kreta und das Mykenische Hellas ( Spyridon Marinatos, 1960.</ref> His most important article was about "the volcanic destruction of Minoan Crete" [Antiquity 1939]. His excavations at Thera have been published in six slender volumes (1968–74).  "Life and Art in Prehistoric Thera" was one of his last publications in 1972.

His name is mentioned in the video game Indiana Jones and the Fate of Atlantis, which also features a plot involving Thera and the legendary underwater lost city.

The book Voyage to Atlantis'', written by James W Mavor, Jr., details the 1967 excavation of Thera, over which Marinatos presided.  The book mentions how Marinatos was, at the same time, aiming to become the Director of Antiquities at the National Archaeological Museum of Athens.  The book also makes note of the political atmosphere in Greece at the time.

Archaeological sites 
Marinatos was responsible for excavations at:
 Akrotiri (prehistoric city), Thera
 Amnisos
 Arkalochori
 Vathypetro

See also 
 National Archaeological Museum of Athens
 Archaeological Museum of Chora

References

External links 
 Archaeological site of Akrotiri Thera:

1901 births
1974 deaths
Greek archaeologists
Mycenaean archaeologists
Minoan archaeologists
Academic staff of the National and Kapodistrian University of Athens
People from Paliki
Members of the Academy of Athens (modern)
Herder Prize recipients
Archaeologists of the Bronze Age Aegean
20th-century archaeologists
Corresponding Fellows of the British Academy
Members of the American Philosophical Society